Trifești is a village in Rezina District, Moldova.

Natives
Călin Gruia (1915-1989), writer, author of children's fairy tales and poems

References

Villages of Rezina District